Bagh Chamak (also Romanized as Bāgh Chamak and Bāghchemak; also known as Bāgh) is a village in Howmeh Rural District, in the Central District of Bam County, Kerman Province, Iran. At the 2006 census, its population was 1,013, in 249 families.

References 

Populated places in Bam County